Lamiopsis is a genus of shark in the family Carcharhinidae found in Indian and Pacific Ocean. This genus was previously considered to be monotypic. However, a recent taxonomic study revealed that the western central Pacific populations were a separate species.

Species
There are currently 2 recognized species in this genus:
 Lamiopsis temminckii (J. P. Müller & Henle, 1839) (Broadfin shark) 
 Lamiopsis tephrodes (Fowler, 1905) (Borneo broadfin shark)

References

 
Shark genera
Taxa named by Theodore Gill